Psalm 131 is the 131st psalm of the Book of Psalms, beginning in English in the King James Version: "Lord, my heart is not haughty". In Latin, it is known as "Domine non est exaltatum cor meum". In the slightly different numbering system used in the Greek Septuagint version of the bible and in the Latin Vulgate, this psalm is Psalm 130.

The psalm is one of the fifteen Songs of Ascents (Shir Hama'alot), and one of three psalms consisting of only three verses. It is attributed to David and is classified among the psalms of confidence.

The psalm forms a regular part of Jewish, Catholic, Lutheran, Anglican and other Protestant liturgies. It has often been set to music, notably by Heinrich Schütz and in the final movement of Bernstein's Chichester Psalms.

Background
Psalm 131 is one of the shortest chapters in the Book of Psalms, being one of three psalms with only three verses (the others are Psalms 133 and 134). The shortest psalm is Psalm 117, with two verses. Psalm 131 is classified among the psalms of confidence.

Text

Hebrew Bible version
Following is the Hebrew text of Psalm 131:

King James Version
 Lord, my heart is not haughty, nor mine eyes lofty: neither do I exercise myself in great matters, or in things too high for me.
 Surely I have behaved and quieted myself, as a child that is weaned of his mother: my soul is even as a weaned child.
 Let Israel hope in the LORD from henceforth and for ever.

Themes
Charles Spurgeon notes that this psalm is both by and about David, expressing his humility, his confidence, and his commitment to perform the will of God. The Midrash pairs the phrases in verse 1 with specific events in David's life that he could certainly have bragged about, yet he retained his humility. These events were:
"My heart was not haughty" – when Samuel anointed me king
"nor were my eyes lofty" – when I slew Goliath
"neither did I swagger about" – when I was restored to my kingship
"nor did I accept as my due things too high for me" – when I had the Ark of God brought up out of Philistine captivity

When asked what it means to trust in God, the Vilna Gaon quoted verse 2 of this psalm. He explained that just as a nursing baby that is satiated doesn't worry whether there will be more milk for him when he is hungry again, one who trusts in God does not worry about the future.

The Jerusalem Bible notes a parallel with the words of the prophet Isaiah:
Your salvation lay in conversion and tranquility, your strength in complete trust;and you would have none of it.Uses

Judaism
Psalm 131 is one of the 15 Songs of Ascents recited after the Shabbat afternoon prayer in the period between Sukkot and Shabbat HaGadol (the Shabbat prior to Passover).

Catholicism
Since the Middle Ages, according to the Rule of St. Benedict (530), it was traditionally recited or sung at the office of vespers on Tuesday between Psalm 130 and Psalm 132.Psautier latin-français du bréviaire monastique, (1938/2003) p. 499.

Currently, in the Liturgy of the Hours, Psalm 131 is in the Office of Readings on Saturday of the first week and vespers on Tuesday of the third week of the four weekly cycle of liturgical prayers. In the liturgy of the Mass, it is recited in the 31st week on Sunday A8, and in the 31st week on Mondays in even years and Tuesdays in odd years.

Musical settings 
Michel-Richard de Lalande composed his great motet for this psalm (s.28) at the end of the seventeenth century, before 1689, for the offices at the royal chapel of the castle of Versailles. In 1691, the work was revised and improved. Heinrich Schütz set the psalm in German for choir as part of his setting of the Becker Psalter as SWV 236, "Herr, mein Gemüt und Sinn du weißt" (Lord, you know my mind and sense).

The psalm in Hebrew is the text of the final movement of Leonard Bernstein's Chichester Psalms, an extended work for choir and orchestra, with verse 1 of Psalm 133 added.

The English composer David Bednall composed a choral anthem titled "O Lord, I am not haughty" using Psalm 131 that was sung by The Queen's College, Oxford choir on their 2018 recording, The House of the Mind''.

References

External links 

 
 
 Psalms Chapter 131 text in Hebrew and English, mechon-mamre.org
 Psalm 131 – David’s Humble, Learned Contentment in the LORD text and detailed commentary, enduringword.com
 A song of ascents. Of David. "LORD, my heart is not proud" text and footnotes, usccb.org United States Conference of Catholic Bishops
 Psalm 131:1 introduction and text, biblestudytools.com
 Psalm 131 / Refrain: O Israel, trust in the Lord. Church of England
 Psalm 131 at biblegateway.com
Hymnary.org, Hymns for Psalm 131

131
Works attributed to David